Strange Angel is an American historical drama streaming television series that premiered on June 14, 2018, on CBS All Access. The series is based on the biography of Thelemic magician and scientist Jack Parsons. Strange Angel: The Otherworldly Life of Rocket Scientist John Whiteside Parsons by George Pendle and was created by Mark Heyman, who also executive produces and writes for the show. On October 29, 2018, it was announced that CBS All Access had renewed the series for a second season that premiered on June 13, 2019. In November 2019, the series was canceled after two seasons.

Premise
Strange Angel follows "Jack Parsons, a brilliant and ambitious blue-collar worker of 1930s Los Angeles who started as a janitor at a chemical factory but had fantastical dreams that led him to birth the unknown discipline of American rocketry. Along the way, he fell into a mysterious world that included sex magic rituals at night, and he became a disciple of occultist Aleister Crowley. Parsons used Crowley's teachings of self-actualization to support his unimaginable and unprecedented endeavor to the stars."

Cast and characters

Main

 Jack Reynor as Jack Parsons
 Bella Heathcote as Susan Parsons
 Peter Mark Kendall as Richard Onsted
 Greg Wise as Alfred Miller, the magus
 Rupert Friend as Ernest Donovan
 Rade Šerbedžija as Prof. Filip Mešulam
 Zack Pearlman as Samson Hunt
 Keye Chen as Gui Chiang
 Laine Neil as Patty Byrne (season 2; recurring season 1), Susan's younger half-sister.

Recurring

 Michael Gaston as Virgil Byrne, Susan's step-father.
 Dan Donohue as Professor John Tillman
 Karl Makinen as General Braxton
 Amara Zaragoza as Joan
 Rob Zabrecky as The Minder
 Louis Mustillo as Humphrey
 Randy Oglesby as Father Shelby
 Veronica Osorio as Marisol
 Elena Satine as Maggie Donovan
 Phil Abrams as Professor Gilford Crompton
 David Wells as Professor George Cleveland
 Kerry O'Malley as Mrs. Byrne, Susan's mother.
 Travina Springer as Alice
 Hope Davis as Ruth Parsons, Jack's mother.
 Colleen Foy as Cassandra
 Lyliana Wray as Young Susan
 Stewart Skelton as Provost
 Todd Stashwick as Marvel Parsons, Jack's father.
 Josh Zuckerman as Marvin Nickels

Guest

Eugene Cordero as Pueblo Powder Company Employee ("Augurs of Spring")
Texas Battle as Murphy ("Ritual of the Rival Tribes")
Michael Spellman as Earl Kynett ("The Sage")
Michael Balin as Aleister Crowley ("The Sacrificial Dance")
Angus Macfadyen as Aleister Crowley ("The Magus")
Daniel Abeles as Lafayette Ronald Hubbard ("Aeon")

Episodes

Season 1 (2018)

Season 2 (2019)

Production

Development
On October 15, 2014, it was reported that Mark Heyman was writing a television series adaptation of Strange Angel: The Otherworldly Life of Rocket Scientist John Whiteside Parsons by George Pendle for AMC. The series was set to be produced by Ridley Scott and his Scott Free Productions through their first-look deal at the network. By 2016, the series had advanced as far as setting up a writers room and producing multiple scripts for series consideration. AMC ultimately did not proceed with the production.

On August 1, 2017, the project was ordered to series by CBS All Access. The scripts completed for the series while under development at AMC were expected to be utilized after a deal was struck between CBS and AMC. On December 11, 2017, it was reported that the production had been selected to receive California tax credits with the series' credit being around $7.846 million.

On April 19, 2018, it was announced that the series was set to premiere on June 14, 2018. The first season, consisting of ten episodes, was expected to see each episode released weekly on Thursdays. On October 29, 2018, it was announced that CBS All Access had renewed the series for a second season. On December 10, 2018, it was reported that the second season would receive $10.6 million in tax credits from the state of California.

On April 18, 2019, it was announced that the second season would premiere on June 13, 2019. On November 26, 2019, CBS All Access canceled the series after two seasons.

Casting
On January 5, 2018, it was announced that Jack Reynor had been cast in the series lead role of Jack Parsons. On January 17, 2018, it was announced that Rupert Friend had joined the main cast in the role of Ernest Donovan. On February 13, 2018, it was announced that Bella Heathcote had been cast in the series' lead female role of Susan Parsons. On February 16, 2018, it was reported that six actors had been added to the series' cast including Peter Mark Kendall, Michael Gaston, Greg Wise, Rade Šerbedžija, Zack Pearlman, and Keye Chen. In March 2018, it was announced that Laine Neil and Elena Satine had joined the series in recurring roles. On April 4, 2018, it was reported that Karl Makinen was joining the series a recurring capacity. On April 23, 2019, Laine Neil was promoted to series regular for season 2.

Release

Marketing
The first trailer for the series was released alongside a promotional poster on May 1, 2018. On May 23, 2018, a second trailer was released.

Premiere
On June 4, 2018, the series held its official premiere at the Avalon Hollywood in Los Angeles, California. The event was attended by cast members, including Jack Reynor, Bella Heathcote, Zack Pearlman, Elena Satine, Keye Chen, Greg Wise, and Rupert Friend.

Reception
On the review aggregation website Rotten Tomatoes, the first season holds a 71% approval rating with an average rating of 6.59 out of 10 based on 17 reviews. The website's critical consensus reads, "A beautiful slow burn, Strange Angel shoots for the stars, but gets a little lost in its own orbit." Metacritic, which uses a weighted average, assigned the season a score of 58 out of 100 based on 9 critics, indicating "mixed or average reviews".

References

External links
 
 

2010s American drama television series
2018 American television series debuts
2019 American television series endings
Paramount+ original programming
English-language television shows
Television shows based on biographies
Television shows directed by Steph Green
Television series by CBS Studios
Television series by Scott Free Productions